Bonamia wilsoniae is a herb in the family Convolvulaceae that is native to Western Australia.

References

wilsoniae
Plants described in 2014